DeVito, De Vito or de Vito is an Italian surname, and may refer to:

Danny DeVito, an American actor
Lucy DeVito, an American actress
Louie DeVito, an American DJ
Tommy DeVito, an American musician
Tony DeVito, a professional wrestler
Karla DeVito, an American singer
Joe DeVito, an American comedian
Cosima De Vito, an Australian singer
Marco De Vito
Gaetano de Vito
Gioconda de Vito, an Italian-British violinist
Mathias J. DeVito, an American businessperson and lawyer
Roberto De Vito

Italian-language surnames